Officially opened on May 10, 2012, as a part of University at Buffalo's 2020 Strategic Plan, construction of Barbara and Jack Davis Hall, known as Davis Hall, started in 2009 with ground-breaking and finished in late 2011 with a construction cost of $75 million including nearly $49.6 million from New York State funding and the rest from corporate and individual endowments. Besides UB Engineering, Davis Hall is the new host to both Computer Science and Electrical Engineering departments featuring several new laboratories and research centers.

The building is constructed by Turner Construction and its exterior design is a reminiscent to printed circuit board representing interaction among faculties and students and is designed by Perkins and Will firm. The building is constructed in accordance with LEED's Gold certificate standards.

Naming 

The building is named after industrialist-turned-political candidate Jack Davis and his wife Barbara, who made the largest endowment ($5 million) among individuals to fund the project. The couple made their first donation of $1.5 million to fund the project in 2008. Jack, a UB Engineering graduate in 1955, and his wife donated an additional $3.5 million to the project making themselves the people who have made the largest endowment in university's history with $5 million endowment.

Tenants

Departments 

The building is the new home to Computer Science and Electrical Engineering departments. However, the building supports five other departments such as Mechanical and Aerospace Engineering, Biomedical Engineering, Civil, Structural and Environmental Engineering, Industrial and Systems Engineering and Chemical and Biological Engineering.

Labs

Notable features

Facilities and research centers 

  of Cleanroom space
 Two 3D Electrical Engineering Labs 
 A smart room 
 A surgery lab 
 A multimedia lab 
 A security lab 
 Two visualization labs 
 Eleven flexible, multi-purpose labs 
 Center of Excellence for Document Analysis and Recognition (CEDAR) 
 Center for Unified Biometrics and Sensors (CUBS)

LEED gold certificate 

On April 4, 2012 it was announced that the building has been certified "Gold" by LEED. The building exceeds the state's energy efficiency code by 34 percent. Some of its features, making the building green, are as follow:

 An outdoor plaza that includes water-efficient landscaping and methods to capture stormwater
 A small green roof
 Waterless urinals
 Bicycle racks
 Constructed with recycled building materials
 Energy-efficient heating, cooling and ventilation systems

References 

University at Buffalo
University and college buildings completed in 2011
University and college academic buildings in the United States
Leadership in Energy and Environmental Design gold certified buildings
2011 establishments in New York (state)